Adelle Waldman is an American novelist, columnist and blogger. Her first novel, The Love Affairs of Nathaniel P., was published in 2013.

Life and education 
Waldman was born in Baltimore, Maryland, in 1977. She has one brother, Steve Randy Waldman, who blogs about finance and economics.

Adelle Waldman graduated from Brown University in 1998. She later attended the Columbia University Graduate School of Journalism.

Writing

Early career 
Waldman worked as a reporter at the New Haven Register, located in New Haven, Connecticut; and The Plain Dealer, located in Cleveland, Ohio, and wrote a column for the website of The Wall Street Journal. She has written book reviews and essays for Slate, The New Republic, Vogue.com, and The New York Observer, among others. While writing The Love Affairs of Nathaniel P., she worked as an SAT tutor.

The Love Affairs of Nathaniel P. 
Waldman published her first novel, The Love Affairs of Nathaniel P., in 2013. It was heralded as one of the year's best books. It follows Nate Piven, a writer living in Brooklyn, New York, and his romantic relationship with a woman whom Nate considers an intellectual match but with whom he finds other faults.

Waldman later published, as a Kindle single on Amazon.com, a novella telling the same story from the point of view of Aurit, a female friend of Nate's. An excerpt of The Love Affairs of Nathaniel P., read by Waldman, will appear on the new Lit Hub/Podglomerate Storybound (podcast), accompanied by an original score from singer-songwriter Haley Johnsen.

Selected bibliography

References

External links

 

1975 births
Living people
21st-century American novelists
21st-century American women writers
American magazine writers
American newspaper journalists
American women journalists
American women novelists
Brown University alumni
Columbia University Graduate School of Journalism alumni
Journalists from Connecticut
Journalists from Maryland
Journalists from Ohio
The New Yorker people
Writers from New Haven, Connecticut
Writers from Cleveland
Place of birth missing (living people)
Novelists from Maryland
Novelists from Ohio
Novelists from Connecticut
21st-century American non-fiction writers